PeerTracker is a free (licensed as GPL) BitTorrent peer tracker software written in PHP that is designed to be fast and to have a low consumption of system resources.

Details 
The focus of this project is to create a tracker in PHP that is fast, uses minimal server resources meanwhile providing full scale tracking capabilities.
 
PeerTracker does not concern itself with the indexing or uploading of torrents, nor with share ratio monitoring or any other form of user management.

It has been designed from the ground up to be easily deployed and operated from any shared or dedicated hosting environment.

Features 
 Operates under BEP 3, additionally supporting BEP 23
 Code is fully PHP 5+ E_STRICT & E_DEPRECATED compliant.
 profiled and optimized for extremely fast execution and minimal cpu/memory/database usage

Requirements
 HTTP Server (Apache, Nginx, lighttpd, Hiawatha, Cherokee etc...)
 PHP 5 (Recommend PHP 5.3+)
 Access to one of the below Databases
 SQLite3 (Integrated in PHP 5.3+)
 MySQL 4.1 (Recommend MySQL 5.1+)
 PostgreSQL (Coming Soon)
 txtSQL (Coming Soon)

External links 
 Official PeerTracker Development Site
 Code Mirror at Github

Free network-related software
BitTorrent tracker
Free software programmed in PHP
BitTorrent tracker for Linux